İlber Ortaylı (born 21 May 1947) is a Turkish historian and professor of history of Crimean Tatar origin at the MEF University, Galatasaray University in Istanbul and at Bilkent University in Ankara. In 2005, he was appointed as the director of the Topkapı Museum in Istanbul, until he retired in 2012.

Biography

Family and personal life 
He was born on 21 May 1947 in a refugee camp in Bregenz, Austria where his parents, Crimean Tatars, had fled to avoid Joseph Stalin's persecution. His family immigrated to Turkey when he was 2 years old. Ortayli is maternally a descendant of  Crimean Tatar Mirza nobility.

He grew up trilingual, learning German from his father and Russian from his mother. As a polyglot historian he is proficient in Turkish, Italian, English, French, Arabic, Persian, Ottoman Turkish, Russian and Latin. His published articles are mainly in Turkish, German and French and a variety of them are translated into English.

During his studies in Turkey, he  worked as a travel guide, which, according to him, influenced his approach to history.  It cultivated his apprehension in practice and gave him an opportunity "to teach history" to different groups of people with various backgrounds. He credits his experiences as a travel guide in his writing of "popular history" books and essays.

He made acquaintance with intellectuals from both Turkey and  other countries. Notable are Halil İnalcık, Irene Melikoff, Bernard Lewis, Andreas Tietze.

His biography Zaman Kaybolmaz: İlber Ortaylı Kitabı (Time Does not Disappear: Book of İlber Ortaylı) was published in 2006. The book includes a long journalistic conversation with Nilgün Uysal, passages from his childhood, student years in Ankara, Vienna and Chicago, his recent reflections on near history events and anecdotes from the years when he worked as a travel guide all over Turkey.

Academic career 
Ortaylı started elementary school at St. George's Austrian High School in İstanbul and later transferred to Ankara Atatürk High School. He studied Public policy at Ankara University Mekteb-i Mülkiye (School of Political Science) and later left for Vienna to attend University of Vienna where he studied both Slawistik and Orientalistik while working with Andreas Tietze.  He received his master's degree under the supervision of professor Halil İnalcık at the University of Chicago and obtained his doctorate at Ankara University in the School of Political Sciences. His doctoral thesis was Local Administration in the Tanzimat Period (1978). After his doctorate, he joined the faculty at the School of Political Sciences of Ankara University. In 1979, he was appointed as associate professor. In 1982, he resigned from his position, protesting the academic policy of the government established after the 1980 Turkish coup d'état. After teaching at several universities in Turkey, Europe and Russia, in 1989 he returned to Ankara University and became professor of history and the head of the department of administrative history.

Public figure 

Several of Ortaylı's political positions have been criticized, notably his denial of the Armenian Genocide.

Works
Ortaylı published numerous articles focused on diplomacy, cultural history and intellectual history. Some examples are:
 Ottoman History
 Russian history (e.g. "Romanovs and Constantinople" and "19th century Russian Empire")
 Ottoman-Habsburg Relations
 German Influence in the 19th century Ottoman Empire (as his masters degree thesis)
 Travel writing In the Ottoman Empire
 History of Turkish Drama

He also published articles on urban history like Latins of the Pera district of the Constantinople for Istanbul and various historical cities which were once under the Ottoman influence; history of provincial administration focusing on the transformation of institutions in the Ottoman Empire from the beginning to the 19th century.

Awards 
In 2001, he received the Aydın Doğan Foundation Award for his work "Family in the Ottoman History".

In 2007, he received the Medal of Pushkin for his "great contribution to the spread and study of the Russian language, the preservation of cultural heritage and the rapprochement and mutual enrichment of different nations’ and people's cultures" under a decree signed by Vladimir Putin and announced officially by the Kremlin, the ceremony took place at the Russian Consulate in Istanbul.

In 2011, he was chosen as honorary member to the Macedonian Academy of Sciences and Arts.

Affiliations 
He is a member of the Foundation for International Studies, the Societas Iranologica Europeae and the Austrian-Turkish Academy of Sciences, Tarih vakfı (Economical and Social History Institute of Turkey)

Books

Yahudilik Tarihi Ahmet Almaz ile 2007 Nokta Kitap

References

External links

1947 births
Living people
People from Bregenz
Writers from Istanbul
20th-century Turkish historians
21st-century Turkish historians
Turkish people of Crimean Tatar descent
Austrian people of Turkish descent
Historians of Turkey
Academic staff of Galatasaray University
Academic staff of Bilkent University
Ankara University Faculty of Political Sciences alumni
University of Chicago alumni
University of Vienna alumni
Academic staff of Ankara University
St. George's Austrian High School alumni
Honorary members of the Turkish Academy of Sciences
Deniers of the Armenian genocide